The following is a list of current records for Apollo asteroids.

Discovery records 
 1st Discovered:  1862 Apollo (1932)

Size records 
 Largest:  1866 Sisyphus
 Smallest:  2008 TC3 (destroyed in Earth's atmosphere), 2003 SQ222

Orbit element records 
 Smallest Perihelion:  2004 FN8
 Smallest Semi-Major Axis:  
 Smallest Aphelion:  1991 VG
 Largest Perihelion:  
 Largest Semi-Major Axis:  1999 XS35
 Largest Aphelion:  1999 XS35
 Lowest Inclination:  (152685) 1998 MZ
 Highest Inclination:  (5496) 1973 NA
 Lowest Eccentricity:  1991 VG
 Highest Eccentricity:

External links 
 List of Apollo minor planets

Asteroid records